The 2020 FC Tucson season is the ninth season in the soccer team's history and their second in USL League One, a league in the third division of American soccer. FC Tucson, as a child club of Phoenix Rising FC of USL Championship, are barred from participating in the 2020 U.S. Open Cup. FC Tucson play their home games at Kino North Stadium, located in Tucson, Arizona, United States.

Club

Roster

Coaching staff

Front Office Staff

Competitions

Exhibitions

USL League One

Standings

Results summary

Match results

Statistics

Goalkeepers

Notes

References 

FC Tucson
FC Tucson
FC Tucson
FC Tucson
FC Tucson seasons